Strana zelených can refer to one of several Green parties:

For Czech Republic, see Green Party (Czech Republic) 
For Slovakia, see Green Party (Slovakia)